Elachista epimicta is a moth of the family Elachistidae. It is found in Alberta, Alberta, British Columbia, Manitoba, Saskatchewan, Colorado, Illinois, Ohio and South Dakota.

The costa in the basal 1/6 of the forewings is grey. The ground colour is white, with a variable amount of dirty yellowish tinge and often dusted with light grey tips of scales. There is often an indistinct dark brownish-grey spot in the middle of the wing at the fold and another similar spot at 2/3 of the wing. The hindwings are grey and the underside of the wings is grey.

The larvae feed on Hystrix patula and Elymus species. They mine the leaves of their host plant. The mine has the form of a blotch mine and occupies the apical one third of the leaf. The species overwinters in the larval form.

References

epimicta
Moths described in 1948
Moths of North America
Endemic fauna of the United States